A supervolcano is a type of volcano.

Supervolcano may also refer to:

 Supervolcano, a 2005 television disaster film
 Supervolcano, a series of novels by Harry Turtledove